Hamsafa (also Romanized as Hamşafā; also known as Ḩaşşafā and Ḩaşvā) is a village in Mianrud Rural District, Chamestan District, Nur County, Mazandaran Province, Iran. At the 2006 census, its population was 113, in 31 families.

References 

Populated places in Nur County